Chelodina alanrixi is a species of snake-necked fossil turtle which was described in 2001 using material gathered in Redbank Plains, Queensland, Australia. It is a member of the Chelidae Pleurodira. The fossil has been dated to the Eocene Epoch.

References

Chelydera
Turtles of Australia
Fossil taxa described in 2001
Extinct turtles